The Dubai Pharmacy College for girls is the first pharmacy Pharmacy Education institution in the United Arab Emirates, established in 1992 by Dubai philanthropist Haji Saeed Bin Ahmed Al Lootah. In 2005, it won the Dubai Quality Appreciation Programme award for education presented by Sheikh Mohammed bin Rashid Al Maktoum, Crown Prince of Dubai.
The college offers B.Pharm and M.Pharm program in Clinical Pharmacy. It was founded with a vision to educate girls of the Emirate to successfully and confidently meet the dynamic challenges in the healthcare in an Islamic ambience. Endowed with the Dubai Appreciation Award in 2004, our college is accredited and licensed by the Ministry of Education -Higher Education Affairs, CAA of UAE since 1998 for the Bachelor of Pharmacy (BPharm) program and Initial Accreditation since October 2013 for the Masters of Pharmacy (MPharm) program specializing in Clinical Pharmacy and Pharmaceutical Product Development. The Bachelor of Pharmacy degree program of Dubai Pharmacy College for Girls has been granted Provisional Certification (Category 1 and 2) by the ACPE USA. (Accreditation Council for Pharmacy Education), 190 South LaSalle Street, Suite 2850, Chicago, Illinois 60603-3499, United States of America.
It has launched a new certificate course Post-graduate certificate program in healthcare business data analytics with an aim to provide a platform for helathcare professional and interdisciplinary researchers to learn about the fundamental principles, and applications of intelligent data acquisition, processing, and analysis of healthcare data.<ref>-[]-<

References

External links
 Official website
 Accreditation
 

Educational institutions established in 1992
Universities and colleges in Dubai
Pharmacy schools
1992 establishments in the United Arab Emirates